PNA or Pna has a variety of meanings:

Science and engineering
 abbreviation for orchid genus Paphinia
 Pacific–North American teleconnection pattern, a climatic phenomenon
 Parisiensia Nomina Anatomica, the revision of anatomic nomenclature
 Peanut agglutinin, a lectin specific for Gal-β(1-3)-GalNAc
 Peptide nucleic acid, an artificially synthesized polymer similar to DNA or RNA.
 Plastic neutral axis, an engineering value used in plastic section modulus
 Pottery Neolithic A, a division of the Pottery Neolithic period in archaeology

Organizations
 Pakistan National Alliance
 Palestinian National Authority, an administrative autonomous government in parts of the West Bank and the Gaza Strip
 Project for Nuclear Awareness, a non-profit organization that advocates for the abolition of nuclear weapons, co-founded by John C. Haas
 Polish National Alliance, a non-profit organization, the largest Polish – American Fraternal Benefit Society in USA offering life insurance and annuities. Founded in 1880, operates solely for the benefit of  its members.
Pa-O National Army
 Partido Nueva Alianza, the Spanish name for the New Alliance Party (Mexico)
 Parties to the Nauru Agreement
 Pennsylvania NewsMedia Association
 Philippine Nurses Association
 Prefectura Naval Argentina, the Spanish name for the Argentine Naval Prefecture
 National Anticorruption Directorate, Romania; formerly, National Anticorruption Prosecution Office (PNA)

Computing
 HomePNA, a home-computer networking standard
 Personal navigation assistant (PNA)

Other
 Pacific Northern Airlines, acquired by Western Airlines in 1967
 Pamplona Airport
 Partial nail avulsion, a treatment of ingrown toenails
 Philippine News Agency
 Prenuptial agreement, a marriage contract

See also
PNAS, Proceedings of the National Academy of Sciences of the United States of America
PnaS, Phosphate-Sodium Symporter, a sodium/phosphate cotransporter
 Protected Natural Area (disambiguation)